Carlos Daniel Layoy (born 26 February 1991) is an Argentine athlete specialising in the high jump. He won bronze medals at the 2014 and 2018 South American Games.

His personal best in the event is 2.25 metres set in Cochabamba in 2018. This result makes him the joint national record holder.

International competitions

References

1991 births
Living people
Argentine male high jumpers
Athletes (track and field) at the 2011 Pan American Games
Athletes (track and field) at the 2019 Pan American Games
Pan American Games competitors for Argentina
Athletes (track and field) at the 2018 South American Games
South American Games silver medalists for Argentina
South American Games bronze medalists for Argentina
South American Games medalists in athletics
Ibero-American Championships in Athletics winners
World Athletics Championships athletes for Argentina